Admiralty is a subzone of the planning area of Sembawang, in the north of Singapore.

Overview
The Admiralty area contains integrated development plans including Kampung Admiralty, which was launched in April 2014. The community centre for the neighbourhood, named "ACE The Place Community Club", is located at 120 Woodlands Avenue 1 near Woodlands South MRT station. It was officially opened on 2 March that year, replacing a void deck space at Block 547, Woodlands Drive 16 which had been in use since 2003.

Etymology 
This name "Admiralty" reflects the area's association with the large British Naval Base (in the Sembawang area) that was established between 1923 and 1941. Given that the residence of the Rear Admiral of the British Navy was located in this area, the road name probably reflects the Naval High Command. When the British began the construction of the Naval Base they laid out and developed Admiralty Road in 1923 which ran through the Naval Base area. The base was the key British installation in the region and was projected as the Asian bastion of the British Empire between the world wars.

Transportation 
Admiralty is connected to Sembawang and Yishun via Gambas Avenue; the Woodlands Industrial Park and Senoko Industrial Park via Woodlands Avenue 10; Woodlands via Woodlands Avenue 7; Marsiling via Woodlands Square and Woodlands Avenue 3; and the Expressway via Woodlands Avenue 12. It is also connected to Admiralty MRT station via train.

References

Places in Singapore
Woodlands, Singapore